Audaz was a Spanish destroyer of the class of the same name that was built after the Second World War. Audaz was launched in 1951 and completed in 1953. The ship was modified to an anti-submarine escort in the 1960s, and was stricken in 1974.

Design
The Audaz class was based on the French  design, plans for which had been provided to Spain by Nazi Germany after the Fall of France, but with a revised armament. 

Displacement was  standard and  full load. The ship had a unit machinery layout, with boiler and engine rooms alternating. Audaz was armed with three  dual-purpose guns, all mounted aft, with four  anti-aircraft guns (one of which was mounted forward of the ship's bridge) and eight  anti-aircraft guns. Six  torpedo tubes in two triple mounts were fitted. The ship had a complement of 145 men.

In 1960–61 Audaz was refitted to serve as an anti-submarine escort. Anti-aircraft armament consisted of two US  Mark 34 guns mounted aft and two  Bofors L/70 guns, with one forward of the bridge and one aft of the ship's funnels. Two Hedgehog anti-submarine mortars were fitted, together with eight depth-charge throwers and two depth charge racks, and two launchers for  Mark 32 anti-submarine torpedoes. Sensors consisted of MLA-1B air-search radar, SPS-5B surface search radar and SPG-34 fire control radar, with QHBa sonar. The modified ship had a complement of 191.

Construction and service
Audaz was laid down at Sociedad Española de Construcción Naval, Ferrol shipyard on 26 September 1945. Financial problems slowed construction, and she was not launched until 24 January 1951. Audaz underwent successful sea trials between 5 and 6 September 1952 off Ferrol. Audaz entered service on 30 June 1953, joining the 31st Escort Squadron, based at Ferrol.

Audaz completed modification to an anti-submarine escort with American armament and equipment on 28 June 1961, while that year, she was allocated the Pennant number D31. Audaz took part in the anti-submarine exercise "Hispania I" in November–December 1964, which took place in the Gulf of Cadiz, the Straits of Gibraltar and the Alboran Sea, with the task force co-operating with US Navy Neptune anti-submarine aircraft operating out of Rota. Audaz suffered a radar failure during the exercise, and had to use spare parts from the destroyer  to repair her systems.

After the loss of sister-ship  in 1966, the 31st Flotilla, including Audaz, transferred to Cartagena. Audaz was stricken on 9 September 1974.

References

 

Audaz
Audaz
Audaz